The Gymnastics competitions in the 1981 Summer Universiade were held in Bucharest, Romania.

Men's events

Women's events

References
 Universiade gymnastics medalists on HickokSports

1981 in gymnastics
1981 Summer Universiade
Gymnastics at the Summer Universiade